The International Association for the Evaluation of Educational Achievement (IEA) is an independent, international cooperative of national research institutions and governmental research agencies. It conducts large-scale comparative studies of educational achievement and other aspects of education.

Since its founding in 1958, IEA has conducted more than 30 research studies of cross-national achievement. IEA studies focus on subjects relating to mathematics, science, reading, civic and citizenship education, computer and information literacy, and teacher education, among others.

History

Even though the IEA became a legal entity in 1967, its origins date back to 1958 when a group of scholars, educational psychologists, sociologists, and psychometricians met at the UNESCO Institute for Education in Hamburg, Germany, to discuss problems of school and student evaluation. They believed that an effective evaluation requires examination of both educational inputs as well as its outcomes (such as knowledge, attitudes, and participation). The founders assumed that if research could obtain evidence from across a wide range of systems, the variability would be sufficient to reveal important relationships within different school systems. They strongly rejected data-free assertions about the relative merits of various education systems, and aimed to identify factors that would have meaningful and consistent influences on educational outcomes.

The IEA publishes the Trends in International Mathematics and Science Study (TIMMS).

Location

IEA Amsterdam The IEA headquarters is located in Amsterdam, the Netherlands.

IEA Hamburg The IEA's data processing and research department is located in Hamburg, Germany.

References

External links 
The International Association for the Evaluation of Educational Achievement
The International Association for the Evaluation of Educational Achievement. ERIC Digest 

Educational testing and assessment organizations
Organisations based in Amsterdam